Ernster is a small town in the commune of Niederanven, in central Luxembourg.  , the town has a population of 346.

ERNSTER is also the name of a bookshop.

Niederanven
Towns in Luxembourg